The Balmi River ( or simply Balmi) is a river in the municipality of Fauske in Nordland county, Norway.

The Fagerli and Daja hydroelectric power stations, operated by Salten Kraftsamband, are located on the river.

References

Fauske
Rivers of Nordland
Rivers of Norway